Characidium sterbai is a species of South American darter (family Crenuchidae) endemic to Peru where it is found in the upper Amazon River basin.

References

Crenuchidae
Fish of South America
Fish of Peru
Taxa named by Axel Zarske
Fish described in 1997